Ophisternon bengalense the Bengal eel, Bengal mudeel or onegill eel, is a species of fish in the family Synbranchidae. It is endemic to freshwater and brackish water rivers and swamps in Oceania and South Asia. It is normally 100 cm in maximum length.

Description
Ophisternon bengalense has an eel-like body with a flattened head with a single slit-like gill opening at the bottom of the back of its head and small eyes which can be seen through its skin. The dorsal and anal fins are reduced and form folds of skin on the rear half of the body, the pectoral and pelvic fins are absent. It can grow to  but is more usually . The colour is blackish-green to rufous with a purplish tinge and dark spots.

Distribution
Ophisternon bengalense is recorded from South Asian countries like India, Bangladesh and Sri Lanka to south-eastern Asia, Indonesia, Philippines and New Guinea. The fish may also found in Australia and Palau islands.

Biology and habitat
Ophisternon bengalense has an almost unknown biology. It is thought likely to be a protogynous hermaphrodite which lays eggs in a tunnel excavated into the soft substrate. The males excavate and guard the nesting burrow. The adults may be found in both fresh and brackish waters along rivers and in swamps, frequently close to the river mouth. They are normally recorded among thick vegetation in muddy, still water bodies, such as lagoons, swamps, canals and rice fields.

Fisheries
Ophisternon bengalense is of minor interest to fisheries and is eaten. It is normally sold and eaten fresh.

References

Sources
 http://biodiversityofsrilanka.blogspot.com/p/freshwater-fish-diversity-of-sri-lanka_29.html

Fish of Australia
bengalense
Freshwater fish of Sri Lanka
Taxa named by John McClelland (doctor)
Fish described in 1844